Khwanruedi Saengchan (born 16 May 1991) is a Thai international footballer who plays as a defender.

International goals

References

External links 
 
 

1991 births
Living people
Women's association football defenders
Khwanrudi Saengchan
Khwanrudi Saengchan
Khwanrudi Saengchan
Khwanrudi Saengchan
Southeast Asian Games medalists in football
Competitors at the 2017 Southeast Asian Games
2019 FIFA Women's World Cup players
Competitors at the 2019 Southeast Asian Games
2015 FIFA Women's World Cup players
Khwanrudi Saengchan